Each "article" in this category is a collection of entries about several stamp issuers, presented in alphabetical order. The entries are formulated on the micro model and so provide summary information about all known issuers.  

See the :Category:Compendium of postage stamp issuers page for details of the project.

Dahomey 

Dates 	1899 – 1944; 1960 – 1975
Capital 	Porto Novo
Currency  	100 centimes = 1 franc

Main Article  

See also 	Benin;
		French West Africa

Dai Nippon 

Refer  	Japanese Naval Control Area

Dairen 

Refer 	Port Arthur & Dairen

Dakar – Abidjan 

Dates         1959 only
Currency      100 centimes = 1 franc

Refer         French West Africa

Dalmatia (German Occupation) 

Dates 	1943 – 1945
Currency 	100 centesimi = 1 lira
		100 Pfennige = 1 Reichsmark

Refer 	German Occupation Issues (WWII)

Dalmatia (Italian Occupation) 

Dates 	1919 – 1923
Currency 	100 centesimi = 1 corona

Refer 	Italian Occupation Issues

Damao 

Refer 	Portuguese India

Danish West Indies 

Dates 	1855 – 1917
Capital 	Charlotte Amalie (St Thomas)
Currency 	(1855) 100 cents = 1 dollar = 5 Danish kroner
		(1905) 100 bit = 1 franc = 1 Danish krone

Main Article  Postage stamps and postal history of the Danish West Indies

Danubian Principalities 

Refer 	Moldo–Wallachia

Danzig 

Dates 	1920 – 1939
Currency 	(1920) 100 pfennige = 1 mark
		(1923) 100 pfennige = 1 Danzig gulden

Refer  Free City of Danzig

Main Article  Postage stamps and postal history of Free City of Danzig

See also 	Danzig (Polish Post Office)

Danzig (Polish Post Office) 

Dates 	1924 – 1939
Currency 	100 groszy = 1 zloty

Refer 	Polish Post Abroad

Dardanelles (Russian Post Office) 

Dates 	1909 – 1910
Currency 	40 paras = 1 piastre

Refer 	Russian Post Offices in the Turkish Empire

Das Island 

Refer 	Abu Dhabi

Datia 

Refer 	Duttia

DDR 

Refer 	East Germany

Debrecen (Romanian Occupation) 

Dates 	1919 – 1920
Currency 	100 filler = 1 korona

Refer 	Romanian Post Abroad

Deccan 

Refer 	Hyderabad

Dédéagh 
Overprint used on French stamps issued by a French post office in the Thracian city of Dedêagatz (now called Alexandroupoli) when it was part of the Ottoman Empire.

Refer 	Dedêagatz (French Post Offices)

Dedêagatz (French Post Office) 
The office issued French stamps with overprint of Dédéagh (see above) when Thrace was part of the Ottoman Empire.

Dates 	1893 – 1914
Currency  	French and Turkish used concurrently

Refer 	French Post Offices in the Turkish Empire

Dedêagatz (Greek Occupation) 
When Greek forces invaded Thrace in 1913 during the Second Balkan War, Bulgarian stamps in use there were overprinted with a Greek inscription and currency value.

Dates 	1913 only
Currency  	100 lepta = 1 drachma

Refer 	Thrace

See also 	Greek Occupation Issues;
		Gumultsina;
		Western Thrace;
		Western Thrace (Greek Occupation)

Democratic Federation of Yugoslavia 

Refer 	Yugoslavia (Democratic Federation)

Denikin Government 

Dates 	1919 – 1920
Currency 	100 kopecks = 1 Russian ruble

Refer 	Russian Civil War Issues

Denmark 

Dates 	1851 –
Capital 	Copenhagen
Currency 	(1851) 96 rigsbank skilling (RBS)= 1 rigsdaler
		(1875) 100 ore = 1 krone

Deutsche Besetzung Zara 

Refer 	Dalmatia (German Occupation)

Deutsche Demokratische Republik (DDR) 

Refer 	East Germany

Deutsche Militarverwaltung Kotor 

Refer 	Dalmatia (German Occupation)

Deutsche Post 

Refer 	East Germany

Dhar 

Dates 	1897 – 1898
Currency 	4 pies = 1 anna

Refer 	Indian Native States

Diego – Suarez 

Dates 	1890 – 1896
Currency 	100 centimes = 1 franc

Refer 	Madagascar & Dependencies

Diu 

Refer 	Portuguese India

Djibouti 

Dates 	1977 –
Capital 	Djibouti
Currency  	100 centimes = 1 franc

Main Article Postage stamps and postal history of Djibouti

Includes 	Djibouti (French Colony);
		Obock

See also 	French Somali Coast;
		French Territory of Afars & Issas

Djibouti (French Colony) 

Dates 	1893 – 1902
Capital 	Djibouti
Currency  	100 centimes = 1 franc

Refer 	Djibouti

Dobruja (Bulgarian Occupation) 

Dates 	1916 only
Currency 	100 stozinki = 1 lev

Refer 	Bulgarian Territories

Dodecanese Islands (British Occupation) 

Refer 	Middle East Forces

Dodecanese Islands (Greek Occupation) 

Dates 	1947 only
Currency 	100 lepta = 1 drachma

Refer 	Greek Occupation Issues

See also 	Aegean Islands (Dodecanese);
		Middle East Forces

Dominica 

Dates 	1874 –
Capital 	Roseau
Currency  	(1874) 12 pence = 1 shilling; 20 shillings = 1 pound
		(1949) 100 cents = 1 dollar

Main Article Postage stamps and postal history of Dominica

Dominican Republic 

Dates 	1865 –
Capital 	Santo Domingo
Currency 	(1865) 8 reales = 1 peso
		(1880) 100 centavos = 1 peso
		(1883) 100 centimos = 1 franc
		(1885) 100 centavos = 1 peso

Main Article Postage stamps and postal history of the Dominican Republic

Don Territory 

Dates 	1918 – 1920
Currency 	100 kopecks = 1 Russian ruble

Refer 	Russian Civil War Issues

Donetsk People's Republic 

Dates 	May 2014 – 
Currency 	100 kopiykas = 1 Ukrainian hryvnia

Refer 	Ukraine

Dorpat (German Occupation) 

Dates 	1918 only
Currency 	100 pfennige = 1 Reichsmark

Refer 	German Occupation Issues (WWI)

Dresden 

Refer 	South East Saxony (Russian Zone)

Dronning Maud Land 

Refer 	Norwegian Dependency

Dubai 

Dates 	1963 – 1972
Capital 	Dubai
Currency  	(1963) 100 naye paise = 1 rupee
		(1966) 100 dirhams = 1 riyal

Main Article  

See also 	British Postal Agencies in Eastern Arabia;
		Trucial States;
		United Arab Emirates (UAE)

Duitsch Oost Afrika Belgische Bezetting 

Refer 	German East Africa (Belgian Occupation)

Dungarpur 

Dates 	1932 – 1948
Currency 	12 pies = 1 anna; 16 annas = 1 rupee

Refer 	Indian Native States

Durazzo (Italian Post Office) 

Dates 	1902 – 1916
Currency 	40 paras = 1 piastre

Refer 	Italian Post Offices in the Turkish Empire

Dutch East Indies

 Dates  1864 - 1950

 Main article  Postage stamps and postal history of the Dutch East Indies

Duttia 

Dates 	1893 – 1899
Currency 	12 pies = 1 anna; 16 annas = 1 rupee

Refer 	Indian Native States

References

Bibliography
 Stanley Gibbons Ltd, Europe and Colonies 1970, Stanley Gibbons Ltd, 1969
 Stanley Gibbons Ltd, various catalogues
 Stuart Rossiter & John Flower, The Stamp Atlas, W H Smith, 1989
 XLCR Stamp Finder and Collector's Dictionary, Thomas Cliffe Ltd, c.1960

External links
 AskPhil – Glossary of Stamp Collecting Terms
 Encyclopaedia of Postal History

Dahomey